Eric Verstappen (born 19 May 1994) is a Dutch footballer who plays as a goalkeeper for German club Würzburger Kickers.

Club career

De Graafschap 
In 2015, Verstappen moved from VVV-Venlo to De Graafschap.

Eintracht Braunschweig II 
In 2017,  Verstappen moved to German club Eintracht Braunschweig II.

Tennis Borussia Berlin 
In 2018, Verstappen moved to Tennis Borussia Berlin,

Würzburger Kickers II 
After Tennis Borussia Berlin Verstappen joined third-division club Würzburger Kickers II in January 2019.

Würzburger Kickers 
Verstappen got promoted to the first team and made his professional debut for Würzburg in the 3. Liga on 20 April 2019, starting in the away match against FSV Zwickau, which finished as a 0–2 loss.

Vitesse 
In 2021, Verstappen transferred to Vitesse. Later that year Verstappen extended his contract for 1 year.

International career
Verstappen began his youth international career with the Netherlands under-15 team, making two appearances for the team, with his debut coming on 9 December 2008 in a 1–0 win against Slovakia. He made his under-16 team debut on 27 October 2009 in a 0–0 draw against France. Overall, he made a total of five appearances for the under-16 team. He made his under-17 debut on 17 September 2010, appearing in a 0–0 draw against Italy. He was included in the Netherlands squad for the 2011 FIFA U-17 World Cup in Mexico. The team were eliminated in the group stage, with Verstappen not making an appearance in the tournament. Overall, he was capped three times for the under-17 team.

References

External links
 
 
 Profile at DFB.de
 Profile at kicker.de
 Profile at Fussball.de

1994 births
Living people
People from Tegelen
Footballers from Limburg (Netherlands)
Dutch footballers
Netherlands youth international footballers
Dutch expatriate footballers
Dutch expatriate sportspeople in Germany
Expatriate footballers in Germany
Association football goalkeepers
PSV Eindhoven players
VVV-Venlo players
De Graafschap players
Eintracht Braunschweig players
Eintracht Braunschweig II players
Tennis Borussia Berlin players
Würzburger Kickers players
SBV Vitesse players
Derde Divisie players
3. Liga players
Regionalliga players
2. Bundesliga players